Monastery of San Jerónimo de Buenavista is a former monastery located in the San Jerónimo neighborhood of Seville, Andalusia, Spain. It was founded in 1414 by Father Diego Martínez de Medina. On 27 August 1964, it was declared a Historical-Artistic Monument. In 1966, it was bought by Carmen Iglesias Zubiada, who turned it into a private residence. In 1984, it was acquired by the Seville City Council. In 2015, it was turned into a neighborhood civic center.

References

External links

Christian monasteries in Spain
Christian monasteries established in the 15th century
Roman Catholic churches in Seville
Former churches in Spain